Edgar Studholme (29 July 1866 – 1 June 1949) was a New Zealand cricketer. He played in one first-class match for Canterbury in 1891/92.

See also
 List of Canterbury representative cricketers

References

External links
 

1866 births
1949 deaths
New Zealand cricketers
Canterbury cricketers